Crouy-Saint-Pierre is a commune in the Somme department in Hauts-de-France in northern France.

Geography

Places of interest
A Cistercian abbey, the Abbaye du Gard, founded in 1137 by Gérard de Picquigny, vidame of Amiens, lies within the boundaries of the commune.

Population

See also
Communes of the Somme department

References

Communes of Somme (department)